The 1963 Lamar Tech Cardinals football season  represented Lamar State College of Technology—now known as Lamar University—as an independent during the 1963 NCAA College Division football season. Led by first-year head coach Vernon Glass, the Cardinals compiled a record of 5–4. Lamar Tech played home games at Greenie Stadium, located off-campus at South Park High School in Beaumont, Texas, for the final season. In 1964, the team moved to the newly-opened Cardinal Stadium—now known as Provost Umphrey Stadium, located of Lamar Tech's campus.

Schedule

References

Lamar Tech
Lamar Cardinals football seasons
Lamar Tech Cardinals football